is an official history of the Ryūkyū Kingdom compiled between 1743 and 1745 by a group of scholar-officials led by . Later records continued to be added to the chronicle until 1876.

See also

 List of Cultural Properties of Japan - writings (Okinawa)

References

Japanese chronicles
Ryukyu Kingdom
Edo-period history books